Jacobo María Ynclán Pajares (born 4 February 1984), sometimes known simply as Jacobo, is a Spanish professional footballer who plays as a midfielder.

Club career
Born in Madrid, Jacobo played once for Atlético Madrid's first team, coming on as a substitute for Luciano Galletti in injury time of a 3–1 La Liga away win against RC Celta de Vigo on 14 January 2007, but his career was spent mainly in the lower divisions – he also spent one season in Belgium loaned to R.E. Mouscron, before being definitely released by the Colchoneros on 30 June 2008.

In the following three years, Jacobo represented Deportivo Alavés, CD Guadalajara and RSD Alcalá, the first team in the second division and the other two in the third. He appeared in only six matches out of a possible 42 with the former club, with the campaign also ending in relegation.

Jacobo signed for Austria's Wolfsberger AC in the summer of 2011. He scored a career-best 14 goals from 34 appearances in his first year, helping to promotion to the Austrian Football Bundesliga.

References

External links

1984 births
Living people
Footballers from Madrid
Spanish footballers
Association football midfielders
La Liga players
Segunda División players
Segunda División B players
Tercera División players
Atlético Madrid B players
Atlético Madrid footballers
Polideportivo Ejido footballers
UE Lleida players
Deportivo Alavés players
CD Guadalajara (Spain) footballers
RSD Alcalá players
Royal Excel Mouscron players
Austrian Football Bundesliga players
2. Liga (Austria) players
Wolfsberger AC players
Spanish expatriate footballers
Expatriate footballers in Belgium
Expatriate footballers in Austria
Spanish expatriate sportspeople in Belgium
Spanish expatriate sportspeople in Austria